Zhu Meifang (born August 1965) is a Chinese materials scientist, former vice-president of Donghua University, and currently serving as its dean of School of Materials Science and Engineering.

Education

Zhu was born in Rugao, Jiangsu in August 1965. She earned a bachelor's degree in chemical fiber in 1986, a master's degree in chemical fiber in 1988, and a doctor's degree in materials science in 1999, all from China Textile University (now Donghua University).

Career
After university, she taught there, where she was vice-president between September 2005 and December 2009. She works as dean of School of Materials Science and Engineering since September 2014.

Honours and awards
 2009 National Science Fund for Distinguished Young Scholars 
 July 10, 2019, Academician of the Asia-Pacific Academy of Materials
 November 22, 2019 Member of the Chinese Academy of Sciences (CAS)

References

1965 births
Living people
People from Rugao
Scientists from Nantong
Donghua University alumni
Academic staff of Donghua University
Members of the Chinese Academy of Sciences
Educators from Nantong